The 2018 ICC World Cricket League Division Four was an international cricket tournament that took place during April and May 2018 in Malaysia. It formed part of the 2017–19 cycle of the World Cricket League (WCL) which determined the qualification for the 2023 Cricket World Cup. The top two teams were promoted to the 2018 ICC World Cricket League Division Three tournament and the bottom two teams were relegated to Division Five.

Two of the three final round of group stage matches finished as a no result because of rain. Per the rules of the tournament, the matches were replayed on the final day of the competition, with the play-off round scrapped and used as a reserve day. Therefore, the final league standings were used to determine the promotion and relegation places.

Uganda won the tournament and were promoted to Division Three, along with runners-up Denmark. Vanuatu and Bermuda finished in fifth and sixth respectively, and were relegated to Division Five. Hosts Malaysia finished third and Jersey finished fourth, therefore both team remained in Division Four. Ben Stevens of Jersey was named as the player of the tournament.

Teams
Six teams qualified for the tournament:

  (5th in 2017 ICC World Cricket League Division Three)
  (6th in 2017 ICC World Cricket League Division Three)
  (3rd in 2016 ICC World Cricket League Division Four)
  (4th in 2016 ICC World Cricket League Division Four)
  (1st in 2017 ICC World Cricket League Division Five)
  (2nd in 2017 ICC World Cricket League Division Five)

Preparation
The Uganda cricket team played a 20-over match and four 50-over matches against the Saudi Arabia cricket team in Kyambogo and Lugogo to prepare ahead of the tournament. Uganda also played two friendly matches against a visiting academy team from India. Malaysia played matches against Singapore in March 2018, for the Stan Nagaiah Trophy. Jersey played two one-day games against Kent County Cricket Club, before playing two further warm-up games in Singapore. Bermuda played three practice matches in Dubai before travelling to Malaysia for the tournament.

Squads

Points table

Fixtures
The fixtures were confirmed by the International Cricket Council (ICC) in April 2018.

Round robin

Replays
As the following two matches finished in a no result on the previous day, the scheduled play-off round was scrapped, with the fixtures restarted from scratch.

Final standings

Notes

References

External links
 Series home at ESPN Cricinfo
 Series home at the International Cricket Council

2017–19 ICC World Cricket League
2018 in Malaysian sport
International cricket competitions in 2018
International cricket competitions in Malaysia